Verkhutikha is a rural locality (a village) in Malyginskoye Rural Settlement, Kovrovsky District, Vladimir Oblast, Russia. The population was 78 as of 2010.

Geography 
Verkhutikha is located 9 km northwest of Kovrov (the district's administrative centre) by road. Kuznechikha is the nearest rural locality.

References 

Rural localities in Kovrovsky District